Balsam is a variety of traditional Eastern and Northeastern European herbal, high alcohol content (40-45%) liqueurs originally used for medicinal purposes.

Examples

 Riga Black Balsam
 Ukrainian Balsam
 Krasnaya Polyana Balsam 
 Karelian Balsam

See also

References

Bitters
Herbal liqueurs